Mickey Soto (born 8 December 1967) is a Puerto Rican hurdler. He competed in the men's 110 metres hurdles at the 1996 Summer Olympics.

References

1967 births
Living people
Athletes (track and field) at the 1996 Summer Olympics
Puerto Rican male hurdlers
Olympic track and field athletes of Puerto Rico
Place of birth missing (living people)